(also spelled Bandtke; 1768–1835) was a Polish linguist, philologist, historian, bibliographer and lexicographer.

External links 
Boroń Piotr, Jerzy Samuel Bandtkie a Śląsk i Ślązacy

19th-century Polish historians
Polish male non-fiction writers
Polish lexicographers
Polish philologists
1768 births
1835 deaths
Writers from Lublin
18th-century Polish historians